Hodeidah University (also spelled Hodeida University) (Arabic: جامعة الحديدة) was established in Hodeida, Yemen as an official university in 1996. Before its foundation, Education College was already established in 1988 as a branch of Sana'a University.

The university consists of 18 colleges:

 Education College in Hodeida
 Education College in Zabid
 Commerce and Economy College
 Sharia and Law College
 Faculty of Arts
 College of Marine Science and Environment
 Faculty of Physical Education and Sports
 Faculty of Medicine and Health Sciences 
 Faculty of Fine Arts
 Faculty of Science and Computer Engineering
 Faculty of Dentist
 Faculty of Engineering: Petroleum Engineering, Chemical Engineering and Food engineering
 Faculty of Clinical Pharmacy
 Faculty of Education and Applied Sciences - Bajil
 Faculty of Education and Applied Sciences - Raymah
 Faculty of Science and Administration - Bait Al-Faqih
 Faculty of Agriculture 
 Faculty of Specific Education - Al Khawkhah

External links
https://hoduniv.net.ye/

Universities in Yemen
Educational institutions established in 1996
1996 establishments in Yemen